The ASAH1 gene encodes in humans the acid ceramidase enzyme.

Function 

This gene encodes a heterodimeric protein consisting of a nonglycosylated alpha subunit and a glycosylated beta subunit that is cleaved to the mature enzyme posttranslationally. The encoded protein catalyzes the synthesis and degradation of ceramide into sphingosine and fatty acid. Mutations in this gene have been associated with a lysosomal storage disorder known as Farber disease and, recently, with a rare neurodegenerative condition known as spinal muscular atrophy with progressive myoclonic epilepsy. Two transcript variants encoding distinct isoforms have been identified for this gene. In melanocytic cells ASAH1 gene expression may be regulated by MITF.

As a glioblastoma drug target 

ASAH1 expression is upregulated following radiation, suggesting it plays a role in conferring radioresistance to glioblastoma and in the development of recurrent glioblastoma. Inhibiting the activity of ASAH1 with carmofur, a drug that has been approved for clinical treatment of colorectal cancers in several countries, leads to substantial cell deaths and as a result has been proposed as a drug target in the treatment of glioblastoma. It has also been suggested to be a novel drug target against pediatric brain tumors as well.

References

External links

Further reading